Mackenzie District Council is the territorial authority for the Mackenzie District of New Zealand.

The council is led by the mayor of Mackenzie, who is currently . There are also seven ward councillors.

Composition

Councillors

 Mayor 
 Pukaki Ward: James Leslie, Matt Murphy, Emily Bradbury
 Opuha Ward: Anne Munro, Murray Cox, Stuart Barwood

Community boards

 Fairlie Community Board: Les Blacklock, Murray Cox, Angela Habracken, Damon Smith, Leaine Rush
 Tekapo Community Board: Steve Howes, Matt Murphy, Sharron Binns, Chris Scrase, Caroll Simcox
 Twizel Community Board: Jacqui de Buyzer, Amanda Sargent, Renee Rowland, Tracy Gunn, Emily Bradbury

History

The council was established in 1989, replacing the MacKenzie County Council established in 1883.

In 2020, the council had 33 staff, including 10 earning more than $100,000. According to the right-wing Taxpayers' Union think tank, residential rates averaged $1,884.

References

External links

 Official website

Mackenzie District
Politics of Canterbury, New Zealand
Territorial authorities of New Zealand